Las Flores Airport  is an airport serving the Magdalena River port of El Banco, in the Magdalena Department of Colombia.

See also

Transport in Colombia
List of airports in Colombia

References

External links
OurAirports - Las Flores
SkyVector - Las Flores
FallingRain - Las Flores Airport

Airports in Colombia